Great Bliss, Vol. 2 is an album by American jazz saxophonist David S. Ware, the second installment of a two-albums project recorded in 1990 and released on the Swedish Silkheart label. As in the companion Great Bliss, Vol. 1, besides tenor sax Ware plays saxello, stritch and flute.

Reception

In his review for AllMusic, Don Snowden states "If you can only have just one, Great Bliss, Vol. 2 is definitely the pick for painting a much better picture of David S. Ware's quartet as a cohesive musical entity."

Track listing
All compositions by David S. Ware
 "One Two Three" - 12:00 
 "Emptiness" - 4:00 
 "Primary Piece III"- 8:30 
 "Saxelloscape Two" - 5:00 
 "The Child Without - The Child Within" - 10:50 
 "Strichland" - 12:15 
 "Low Strata" - 6:20 
 "Reign of Peace" - 11:00

Personnel
David S. Ware - flute, tenor sax, saxello, stritch
Matthew Shipp - piano
William Parker - bass
Marc Edwards - drums, tympany, chimes, gongs

References

1991 albums
David S. Ware albums
Silkheart Records albums